Hari Kandeh (also Romanized as Harī Kandeh; also known as Harī Kandeh-e Pā’īn) is a village in Ganjafruz Rural District, in the Central District of Babol County, Mazandaran Province, Iran. At the 2006 census, its population was 1,998, in 501 families.

References 

Populated places in Babol County